Cincinnati is an unincorporated community in Center Township, Greene County, Indiana.

History
A post office was established at Cincinnati in 1874, and remained in operation until it was discontinued in 1934. According to tradition, the community was named when a visitor told the innkeeper that the surrounding hills and whiskey made him recall his home in Cincinnati, Ohio.

Geography

Education
Cincinnati has a public library, a branch of the Bloomfield-Eastern Greene County Bloomfield Public Library. Eastern Greene High School is also located in Cincinnati, despite having a Bloomfield address.

References

Unincorporated communities in Greene County, Indiana
Unincorporated communities in Indiana
Bloomington metropolitan area, Indiana